Yen Tan (born 1975) is a Malaysian-born American independent film producer and director.

Early life
Tan emigrated from Malaysia at the age of 19 and is based in Dallas, Texas.

Career
He is known for award-winning films Happy Birthday (2002) and Deadroom (2005). He also directed the gay-themed Ciao (2008) that he had co-written with the film's lead actor Alessandro Calza.

His  screenwriting lab semi-finalist screenplay Pit Stop was selected by the Outfest Screenwriting Lab. The film also screened at the 2013 Sundance Film Festival. He was also a finalist for the prestigious Vilcek Prize for Creative Promise.

Personal life
Tan is openly gay.

Filmography

Director
Feature films
2002: Happy Birthday
2005: Deadroom (Co-directed with James M. Johnston, David Lowery and Nick Prendergast)
2008: Ciao
2013: Pit Stop
2018: 1985

Shorts
2001: Love Stories
2008: Coda
2011: Wanted
2016: 1985

Producer
2005: Deadroom
2008: Coda (short)
2008: My Mom Smokes Weed (short)

Actor
2011: 3 Thumbs Up as himself (documentary)

Awards
For ''Happy Birthday
2002: Won the Jury Prize for "Best Feature - Gay Male" at the Philadelphia International Gay & Lesbian Film Festival
2002: Won New Directors Showcase - Bets Feature award at the Portland LGBT Film Festival
Also earned an honorable mention at Image+Nation in Montreal
For Deadroom
2005: Won Director's Award at the Texas Film Festival (sharing with James M. Johnston, David Lowery and Nick Prendergast)

References

External links

1975 births
Living people
Malaysian film producers
American film producers
Malaysian film directors
American film directors
Malaysian emigrants to the United States
LGBT film directors
LGBT producers
Gay men
Malaysian LGBT people
American LGBT people of Asian descent